Abbie Watts (born 16 May 1997) is an Australian individual trampoline gymnast, representing her nation at international competitions. Watts placed 6th at the 2014 Summer Youth Olympics. She competed at world championships, including at the 2015 Trampoline World Championships.

Personal
Watts lives in Marmion, Australia.

References

External links
 
 Abbie Watts at Gymnastics Australia
 
 
 
 

1997 births
Living people
Australian female trampolinists
Sportswomen from Western Australia
Gymnasts at the 2014 Summer Youth Olympics